Mohamad Fairus Abd Jabal (born 1989) is a Malaysian international lawn bowler.

Bowls career

World Championships
He competed for Malaysia at the 2016 World Outdoor Bowls Championship in New Zealand. In 2020 he was selected for the 2020 World Outdoor Bowls Championship in Australia.

World Singles Champion of Champions
Jabal won a singles silver medal in the 2014 World Singles Champion of Champions in the Christchurch, New Zealand.

Commonwealth Games
He represented Malaysia during the 2014 Commonwealth Games.

Asia Pacific Championships
He won a bronze medal at the 2011 Asia Pacific Bowls Championships in Adelaide. He has also won two gold medals in the triples at the Lawn bowls at the 2017 Southeast Asian Games and the Lawn bowls at the 2019 Southeast Asian Games.

References

Malaysian male bowls players
Living people
1989 births
Bowls players at the 2014 Commonwealth Games
Commonwealth Games competitors for Malaysia
People from Pahang